Lennox Lewis vs. Mike Tyson, billed as Lewis–Tyson: Is On, was a heavyweight professional boxing match that took place on June 8, 2002, at the Pyramid Arena in Memphis, Tennessee. The defending unified WBC, IBF, IBO, and The Ring champion Lennox Lewis defeated former undisputed heavyweight champion Mike Tyson by knockout in the eighth round. Prior to the event, Lewis was awarded The Ring magazine heavyweight title, which had been vacant since the late 1980s and was last held by Tyson.

General information
The fight was originally scheduled for April 6, 2002 in Las Vegas. However, Nevada refused to grant Tyson a license after a press conference brawl between Lewis and Tyson (see below).  Several other states refused Tyson a license before Memphis finally bid US$12 million in order to host the fight.

The referee for the fight was Eddie Cotton, officiating his 20th world title bout. Alfred Buqwana of South Africa, Anek Hongtongkam of Thailand and Bob Logist of Belgium were appointed as judges, as both the WBC and the Tennessee Athletic Commission wanted judges from different continents.

The fight was promoted by Main Events and was a pay-per-view shown as a joint collaboration between HBO and Showtime in the United States and on Sky Box Office in the United Kingdom. The joint promotion was a rarity as at the time HBO and Showtime were arch-rivals in American boxing broadcasting, though it would later be repeated in 2015 with the Floyd Mayweather Jr. vs. Manny Pacquiao match. HBO's Jim Lampley called the fight alongside Showtime's Bobby Czyz, and in addition each fighter was introduced by a ring announcer allied with a specific network: Lewis had HBO's Michael Buffer introduce him, while Jimmy Lennon Jr. of Showtime did the same for Tyson. It was the highest-grossing event in pay-per-view history, generating US$106.9 million from 1.95 million buys in the U.S., until it was surpassed by De La Hoya vs. Mayweather in 2007. In 2013, Mayweather vs. Álvarez surpassed the gross revenue generated from pay-per-view buys.

However, the ticket sales were slow because they were priced as high as US$2,400, but a crowd of 15,327 turned up to see the fight. Lewis entered the bout as 2/1 favorite.

Among the celebrities in attendance were Samuel L. Jackson, Denzel Washington, Tom Cruise, Britney Spears, Clint Eastwood, Ben Affleck, Hugh Hefner, Halle Berry, Richard Gere, Dwayne "The Rock" Johnson, Vince McMahon, The Undertaker, LL Cool J, Tyra Banks, Wesley Snipes, Donald Trump, Kevin Bacon, Chris Webber, Michael Jordan, Magic Johnson, Morgan Freeman, Alec Baldwin, and heavyweight boxer Evander Holyfield.

Press conference brawl
On January 22, 2002, at a press conference held in New York to publicise the bout, a brawl involving the two boxers and their entourages occurred.

Tyson went on stage at the Hudson Theatre and stared in the direction of where Lewis was to appear. As soon as Lewis appeared, Tyson quickly walked toward him and appeared to be about to assault Lewis. One of Lewis' bodyguards attempted to block Tyson's access to Lewis before Tyson threw a left hook in the bodyguard's direction.

The two boxers rolled on the floor with personnel from both camps getting involved.

During the melee WBC president José Sulaimán claimed to be knocked out when he hit his head on the table. He later filed a US$56 million lawsuit against Lewis and Tyson for injuries caused in the scuffle. Sulaiman claims he was spat on and Tyson threatened to kill him, when he got up after being knocked out.

Tyson later admitted to biting Lewis' leg and had to pay him US$335,000.

Following the brawl Tyson came to the edge of the podium, grabbed his crotch and started shouting expletives at someone at the crowd who was later guessed to be either Lewis's mother or a female photographer. Then he overheard freelance journalist Mark Malinowski suggesting that he should be in a straitjacket, which prompted him to issue another profanity-laden tirade, this time directed at Malinowski. He repeatedly referred to the reporter as a "punk white boy" and a "faggot", and punctuated his oration by vowing to "fuck [Malinowski] 'till you love me". The brawl at the press conference for this fight was named The Ring magazine Event of the Year for 2002.

Fight summary by round

Round one: The early moments of the fight provided arguably the most evenly fought display of back-and-forth action between Tyson and Lewis as they started by jabbing away. Just before 30 seconds had elapsed, Tyson leaned forward with a left-jab at Lewis; then lunged towards his midsection, landing a right-and-left combination of body blows before Lewis could manage to steer him backward with three effectively landed uppercuts of his own. As they subsequently traded body shots, Tyson ended the initial sequence by missing on a wild left hook. As the middle stages of the round came about, Lewis began to clinch and grab hold of Tyson as a strategy to fend off his repeated attempts to draw near for body attacks, keeping him at bay. But with just under a minute remaining in the round, Tyson connected with a left hook to Lewis' jaw, catching him off-guard. Lewis stumbled then recovered by once again clinching an approaching Tyson and pushing him back into the ropes while landing another jab. Mike Tyson came out on top of the inaugural round.

Round two: Both fighters began jabbing at one another, before Cotton warned Lewis twice for holding. Lewis landed a number of effective punches on Tyson as he tried to approach, including several powerful uppercuts that kept Tyson staggering backwards.

Round three: As the third round opened Lewis continued jabbing away. Later in the round Tyson went on to headbutt Lewis before connecting with a left hook, but Lewis managed to cut Tyson above his right eye later in the round.

Round four: Again Tyson rushed out in the round's beginning moments, but Lewis then landed two strong jabs before landing a big right. With 10 seconds left in the round Lewis landed a couple of punches on Tyson who went down. Referee Eddie Cotton ruled it a slip and deducted a point from Lewis for pushing Tyson down. Tyson's face had then started to swell.

Round five: Cotton stopped the fight and talked to Lewis again in the fifth round about pushing. As the round went on, a visibly weakened Tyson began throwing fewer and fewer punches while struggling to land on most of his attempts.

Round six: Lewis stayed in control by mostly connecting on jabs. With just over a minute left in the round, Tyson was able to land a couple of shots which had created swelling just below Lewis' left eye. But by the conclusion of the round Tyson had already sustained lacerations above both his eyes.

Round seven: In the seventh round, Lewis put Tyson off balance upon landing a crushing right hook. Lewis once more was overpowering in taking the round, with what was little resistance at that point; continuing on as he had shown without relent through most of the fight, landing 31 punches in comparison to only 4 landed for Tyson.

Round eight: with 47 seconds left to the bell, Tyson was hit with a heavy right cross from Lewis, knocking him to the canvas and down for the second time in the round. As Tyson lay on his back, he was counted out by the referee at the 2:25 mark, as he made no real effort to get back up and continue fighting. Lennox Lewis was declared the winner by KO.

Aftermath
A month later, Lewis vacated the IBF title deciding not to fight Chris Byrd, who was the mandatory challenger.

The fight was named The Ring magazine Knockout of the Year for year 2002.

Undercard
  Manny Pacquiao KOs  Jorge Eliecer Julio in the second for the IBF junior featherweight title.
  Joel Casamayor KOs  Juan Jose Arias in the eighth round.
  David Starie KOs  Roni Martinez in the first round.
  Malik Scott defeats  Dan Ward via unanimous decision.
  Jeff Lacy KOs  Kevin Hall in the third round.
  Nedal Hussein defeats  Ronnie Longakit by unanimous decision.
  Rico Hoye KOs  George Klinesmith in the second round.
  Corinne Van Ryck DeGroot defeats  Jo Wyman via unanimous decision.
  Cornelius Bundrage defeats  Anthony Bowman via unanimous decision.

References

2002 in boxing
Boxing in Tennessee
Sports in Memphis, Tennessee
2002 in sports in Tennessee
Tyson
Lewis
Boxing matches involving Manny Pacquiao
World Boxing Council heavyweight championship matches
International Boxing Federation heavyweight championship matches
Simulcasts
June 2002 sports events in the United States
Boxing on HBO
Boxing on Showtime